The 41st Battalion, Royal New South Wales Regiment, (41 RNSWR), is an infantry battalion of the Australian Army. An Army Reserve unit, it is one of four battalions of the Royal New South Wales Regiment and is attached to the 5th Brigade, 2nd Division. It is based in northern New South Wales, with its headquarters in Lismore and depots in a number of locations including Tweed Heads, Grafton, Kempsey, Port Macquarie and Coffs Harbour. In its present form the battalion was raised in 1965, however, it can trace its lineage back to a couple of Scottish Rifles units formed in the 1800s in Byron Bay and Maclean. It also perpetuates the battle honours and traditions of the 41st Bn AIF, that served on the Western Front during World War I.

History

Earliest militia units
Drawing its lineage from the Byron Scottish Regiment, which had previously existed prior to the Pentropic restructure, 41 RNSWR's predecessor units can trace their history back to the Maclean Company & Byron Company of Scottish Rifles which was formed in 1899. This unit went through a number of name changes during its early history upon Australia's Federation, eventually becoming the 9th Infantry Australian Military Forces (AMF) in 1912. An unrelated unit, designated the 41st Infantry, was based in Penrith, Lithgow and Bathurst at this time.

World War I

1916
During  World War I, the battalion was raised as part of the Australian Imperial Force (AIF). Originally the battalion was to be known as the 35th Battalion but was renumbered when the 4th and 5th Divisions were raised in Egypt prior to the 3rd Division completing its formation in Australia. Now known as the 41st Battalion, it had been formed in February 1916 at Bell's Paddock (present day site of Brookside Shopping Centre and Mt Maria College) near the current Gallipoli Barracks, Enoggera, in Brisbane, Queensland, with men drawn from Queensland and northern New South Wales. It was assigned to the 11th Brigade, 3rd Division. Together with the initial raising of the battalion, nine groups of reinforcements were recruited and sent from Brisbane during the course of the war. After initial training, the battalion boarded a train to Sydney in May, 1916 to embark on the HMAT Demosthenes (AT64), to England. They travelled via Cape Town and the Cape Verde Islands, before arriving at Plymouth in July 1916.

The battalion moved with the 3rd Division to training grounds on Salisbury Plain at Larkhill, site of the current Royal School of Artillery. In November 1916, the battalion sailed for the Western Front from Portsmouth, England, to Le Havre, France, and moved towards the border area with Belgium near Armentières. The battalion entered the frontline for the first time on Christmas Eve, 1916 at the Mushroom Salient, just east of La Chapelle-d'Armentières, of which four soldiers were killed by artillery fire on the first night.

1917
The battalion rotated through the frontline around Armentieres in France and across the Lys River in Belgium for most of the first half of 1917. The first major offensive of the war occurred in June at  the Battle of Messines, where the battalion held the entire 11th Brigade frontage before the mines were set off and the assault began. The battalion was then involved in a series of smaller "Bite and Hold" attacks to exploit the gains from the Battle of Messines. Most notable of these was the assault against the 'Windmill' position of the Germans near Warneton, Belgium. The previous British battalion has stopped short of their intended objective, due to navigational errors on the churned up battlefield. The 41st Battalion thus had to assault across a longer than expected area, then hold on to their gains. The wet and saturated soils meant that trenches were nearly impossible to dig, so the position was merely a series of linked up flooded shell craters, from which the battalion repulsed several counterattacks over the next 18 days. Military Medals were awarded to two soldiers during this action for the heroic and near impossible act of being able to bring rations up to the frontline.

After this action, the battalion was withdrawn from the frontline to the northern France and was brought back up to strength and under went further training. The next major battle was the participation in the Battle of Broodseinde, and Passchendaele in September and October. This saw the battalion leap-frogging the 42nd Bn AIF, to continue the assault, north of the Ypres–Roulers railway. It linked up with the 40th Bn AIF near the present day Tyne Cot Cemetery. The battalion then was used to press home further attacks, until relieved by Canadian forces who went on to capture Passchendaele.

1918
In early 1918, the battalion was resting and refitting in northern France, preparing to return to the Belgian battlefields near Ypres, when the German spring offensive occurred and caught the Entente forces off guard. The battalion was hastily ordered south from their rest camp at Quesques to stop the German advance. In the move south, they encountered thousands of fleeing refugees and disorganised retreating British units. At Doullens, the battalion took up defensive positions whilst the Doullens Conference took place, putting all allied Entente forces under French command. After which, the battalion was sent forward to defend beside the Bray–Corbie Road, near Amiens, remaining in the frontline against constant German attack for 39 days before being relieved. It also took part in fighting around Morlancourt at this time. The battalion then took its turn in manning the frontline, including at Villers-Bretonneux, where 'A' Company was essentially wiped out in a German gas attack. Thus to reinforce the battalion before the Battle of Hamel, it was linked up with the American 131st Regiment of the Illinois National Guard, forming a new 'X' Company. However, General John Pershing forbade any American soldiers to fight under foreign command and they were withdrawn shortly before the battle commenced. The battalion then took part in the Allied Hundred Days Offensive which ultimately brought about an end to the war. The 41st Battalion's final involvement in the fighting came in early October when they took part in the joint Australian–US operation along the St Quentin Canal.

After finishing the Hundred Days Offensive near Bony, France, near the present Somme American Cemetery and Memorial, the battalion had been reduced to a strength of less than 250 men, from a normal strength of over 1,000. Due to falling recruitment numbers and the failure of the two conscription referendums in Australia, it was decided to merge the 42nd Bn AIF into the 41st. However, this was met with strong resentment and resistance, in a near mutinous atmosphere. It took three attempts for the units to parade as one, with the 42nd Bn becoming 'B' Company of the 41st Bn, allowed to wear the 42nd Bn unit colour patch underneath their 41st Bn patch. It was out of the line resting when the Armistice was signed in November 1918, yet it took three days for official news of the Armistice to reach them in Saint-Maxent, France. The unit was slowly sent home in a series of groups and was formally disbanded in May 1919. Losses during the war totalled 444 killed and 1,577 wounded. One member of the battalion, Bernard Gordon, received the Victoria Cross. Other decorations included: one Companion of the Order of St Michael and St George, two Distinguished Service Orders, 13 Military Crosses and three Bars, 12 Distinguished Conduct Medals, 82 Military Medals and two Bars, four Meritorious Service Medals, 26 Mentions in Despatches and seven foreign awards.

Between the World Wars
In 1918, the original militia unit, which did not deploy overseas during World War I, was amalgamated with the 12th (Byron) Infantry AMF to form the 2nd Battalion, 41st Infantry after the Citizens Force was reorganised to form multi-battalion regiments which were numbered after units of the AIF with which they had been associated. The Australian Governor-General Sir Ronald Munro Ferguson presented the King's Colours to the 41st Bn AIF on 23 August 1920 at The Domain, Brisbane. In 1921, the decision was made to disband all of the AIF and to perpetuate their battle honours and traditions by reforming the Citizens Force along the same lines as the AIF, with the multi-battalion regiments being redesignated as separate battalions and adopting the unit colour patches and battle honours of the AIF. Consequently, the 2nd Battalion, 41st Infantry was redesignated as the 41st Battalion.

In 1927, territorial designations were adopted and the battalion adopted the title 41st Battalion (The Byron Regiment). The motto Mors Ante Pudorem was also approved at this time. Unit Colours were presented to the 41st Bn (The Byron Scottish) in Grafton, NSW on 27 March 1927 during the annual training camp. In 1929, the compulsory training scheme was suspended by the Scullin Labor government, and this, combined with the economic hardships of the Great Depression led to a decline in the number of recruits. As a result, the battalion was amalgamated with the 2nd Battalion to form the 2nd/41st Battalion. In 1933, these two units were delinked, however, the 41st Battalion was amalgamated with the 33rd Battalion to form the 33rd/41st Battalion. They remained linked until 1936 when tensions in Europe meant that the government decided to double the size of the Militia.

World War II
During World War II, the battalion served in a garrison role within Australia and did not see active service overseas, even though it was gazetted as an AIF battalion after the majority of its members volunteered to do so. In 1943, when the Australian Army began reallocating manpower resources, the battalion was amalgamated once more with the 2nd Battalion, forming the 41st/2nd Battalion. They remained linked until  December 1945 when the demobilisation process began and the unit was disbanded.

Citizens Military Force
In 1948, the Citizens Military Force was re-raised, albeit on a limited scale. It was in line with the compulsory service introduced after World War II. The 41st Battalion was re-formed at this time, adopting the title 41st Infantry Battalion (The Byron Regiment), however, the following year its title was changed to The Byron Scottish Regiment. This remained the state of affairs until 1960, when the Pentropic divisional structure was introduced and the battalion became 'E' (Byron Scottish) Company, 1st Battalion, Royal Queensland Regiment. The unit remained part of that regiment until being reformed as a full battalion within the Royal New South Wales Regiment after 1965.

Founding of the current battalion
41 RNSWR was formed in 1965 after the Australian Army ended its experiment with the Pentropic divisional structure which, in 1960, had seen the reorganisation of the previously existing regional Citizens Military Force (CMF) infantry battalions into company-sized elements within six new State-based regiments. The experiment was a failure and by 1965, the Army returned to the triangular divisional structure and the CMF was reorganised once more. In an effort to reinvigorate the regional ties that had been so important to the CMF, the Pentropic battalions were reduced and new battalions formed by re-raising a number of their subordinate companies to battalion strength and re-adopting historical numerical designations. As a part of this reorganisation, the Byron Scottish Company, which had been part of the 1st Battalion, Royal Queensland Regiment was expanded to form the 41st Battalion, Royal New South Wales Regiment, headquartered around Lismore on the northern New South Wales coast.

Recent roles
Recently 41 RNSWR has had a number of operational roles. These roles have included providing soldiers to the serve with INTERFET in East Timor and with the Peace Monitoring Groups in Bougainville. In 2000, they took part in providing security to the Sydney Olympic Games through the Operational Search Battalion. Personnel from the battalion have also deployed as part of commitments to the Solomon Islands as part of the Regional Assistance Mission to Solomon Islands (RAMSI) and Malaysia with Rifle Company Butterworth. In 2011, members of the battalion served in East Timor as part of the Timor Leste Task Group (TLTG).

Kilted tradition
Due to its lineage from the Byron Scottish Regiment, 41 RNSWR retains an entitlement to wear the kilt. The battalion was formerly known as the 41st Battalion, The Byron Scottish Regiment. This is due to the large number of Scots who settled in the north of the state in areas such as Grafton, Byron Bay and Maclean. 41 RNSWR maintains an alliance with the Argyll and Sutherland Highlanders and personnel from the battalion's Grafton depot may wear the kilt of the Argyll and Sutherland Highlanders on ceremonial occasions.

Unit motto
"Mors Ante Pudorem" which means "Death before Dishonour". This motto was adopted by 41 RNSWR because since its formation in 1916  none of its personnel have been captured in battle.

Locations
41 RNSWR is located all along the northern New South Wales coast, including depots in:

 Tweed Heads: (1 Platoon, 3 Platoon and Headquarters 'A' Company)
 Lismore: (Battalion Headquarters, Admin Company, 2 Platoon 'A' Company)
 Grafton: (8 Platoon 'C' Company)
 Coffs Harbour: (Headquarters 'C' Company, 7 Platoon)
 Port Macquarie (9 Platoon 'C' Company)
 Taree

Victoria Cross recipients
 Lance Corporal Bernard Sidney Gordon, 41st Battalion, 11th Brigade, 3rd Division:

Notes

References

Further reading

 

Infantry units and formations of Australia
Military units and formations established in 1965